Fezolinetant (former developmental code name ESN-364) is a small-molecule, orally active, selective neurokinin-3 (NK3) receptor antagonist which is under development by Ogeda (formerly Euroscreen) for the treatment of sex hormone-related disorders. As of May 2017, it has completed phase I and phase IIa clinical trials for hot flashes in postmenopausal women. Phase IIa trials in polycystic ovary syndrome patients are ongoing. In April 2017, it was announced that Ogeda would be acquired by Astellas Pharma.

Fezolinetant shows high affinity for and potent inhibition of the NK3 receptor in vitro (Ki = 25 nM,  = 20 nM). Loss-of-function mutations in TACR and TACR3, the genes respectively encoding neurokinin B and its receptor, the NK3 receptor, have been found in patients with idiopathic hypogonadotropic hypogonadism. In accordance, NK3 receptor antagonists like fezolinetant have been found to dose-dependently suppress luteinizing hormone (LH) secretion, though not that of follicle-stimulating hormone (FSH), and consequently to dose-dependently decrease estradiol and progesterone levels in women and testosterone levels in men. As such, they are similar to GnRH modulators, and present as a potential clinical alternative to them for use in the same kinds of indications. However, the inhibition of sex hormone production by NK3 receptor inactivation tends to be less complete and "non-castrating" relative to that of GnRH modulators, and so they may have a reduced incidence of menopausal-like side effects such as loss of bone mineral density.

Unlike GnRH modulators, but similarly to estrogens, NK3 receptor antagonists including fezolinetant and MLE-4901 (also known as AZD-4901, formerly AZD-2624) have been found to alleviate hot flashes in menopausal women. This would seem to be independent of their actions on the hypothalamic–pituitary–gonadal axis and hence on sex hormone production. NK3 receptor antagonists are anticipated as a useful clinical alternative to estrogens for management of hot flashes, but with potentially reduced risks and side effects.

See also
 Tachykinin receptor 3 § Agonists
 List of investigational sex-hormonal agents § GnRH/gonadotropins

References

External links

Antigonadotropins
Fluoroarenes
NK3 receptor antagonists
Thiadiazoles
Triazolopyrazines
N-benzoylpiperazines